Kehl station is a railway station in Kehl, a town in southwestern Germany in the Ortenaukreis, Baden-Württemberg. It is situated on the Appenweier–Strasbourg railway, with trains crossing the Rhine into France to reach the latter destination. Both sides being within the Schengen Area, no passport or border controls apply.

History

The line opened in 1844.

Since June 2007, TGV trains run from Paris Est to Strasbourg, Stuttgart and Munich. Therefore, since 10 June 2007 the Ortenau-S-Bahn has operated railcars every hour (and sometimes every half-hour) between Offenburg and Strasbourg. This change extended previous services to Strasbourg including services formerly ending in Kehl.

Services

InterCity

Regional

Trams
Since 29 April 2017, Strasbourg's tram line D has been running to Kehl and used to terminate at Kehl station. Since November 2018, the tram extends into the town centre "Kehl Rathaus".

References

External links

Railway stations in Baden-Württemberg